Christopher Alan Emigh (born January 14, 1971 in Portsmouth, Virginia) is a jockey in American Thoroughbred horse racing. He earned his first win as a professional at Evangeline Downs in 1989. The winner of more than 4,000 career races, he has won a riding title at Hawthorne Race Course seven times and at Arlington Park in 2006.

References
 Christopher Emigh at the Jockeys' Guild
 Profile of Christopher Emigh at Oaklawn Racetrack

Year-end charts

1971 births
Living people
American jockeys
Sportspeople from Portsmouth, Virginia